was a member of the Imperial House of Japan and the second son of Takahito, Prince Mikasa and Yuriko, Princess Mikasa. He was a first cousin of Emperor Akihito. Originally known as Prince Yoshihito of Mikasa, he received the title Prince Katsura (Katsura-no-miya) and authorization to start a new branch of the Imperial Family on 1 January 1988 at age 39. He died of a heart attack on 8 June 2014, aged 66.

Early life and education 

The Prince was born at the Mikasa Family Home at Kamiōsaki, Shinagawa, Tokyo.

He graduated from the Department of Political Studies in the Faculty of Law of Gakushuin University in 1971. Between 1971 and 1973, he studied at the Graduate School of the Australian National University, in Canberra, Australia. After his return to Japan, he worked as an administrator at the Japan Broadcasting Corporation from 1974 to 1985.

Public service 
In 1982, the Prince returned to Australia as part of the Japanese delegation in honor of the tenth anniversary of the Australia-Japan Society. He also visited New Zealand to strengthen ties and friendly diplomatic relations. Despite his disabilities following a series of strokes in 1988, he took an active role in public service, and appeared regularly at award ceremonies, diplomatic events, and as President of various charity organizations.

In July 1997, Prince Katsura again visited Australia, to help promote an exhibition of the traditional sport of sumo, with exhibition matches held in Sydney and Melbourne.

Health problems and death 
Prince Katsura experienced a series of strokes in May 1988 and had surgery for acute subdural hematoma. He used a wheelchair, but remained active in public life and appeared regularly at award ceremonies, diplomatic events, and as president of various charity organizations. However, he had been hospitalized on and off since 2008 due to sepsis. In early 2014, the Prince was diagnosed with an unspecified illness that affected and deteriorated his heart. In the early morning hours of 8 June 2014, he experienced a massive heart attack, and despite best efforts he was pronounced dead at 10:50 AM local time. He was 66 years old. On 17 June 2014, the main funeral service for Prince Katsura, called "Renso no Gi", was held at Toshimagaoka Imperial Cemetery in Tokyo. About 560 dignitaries including the members of Imperial Family attended the funeral. Prince and Princess Mikasa, Prince Katsura's parents, acted out the duty of chief mourners and his niece, Princess Akiko, hosted the ceremony.

Prince Katsura never married and left no legitimate children. At the time of his death, he was sixth in line to the Japanese throne.

Honours

National 
 Grand Cordon of the Order of the Chrysanthemum (27 February 1968)

Foreign 
  : Knight Grand Cross of the Order of Merit of the Italian Republic (09/03/1982)

Honorary positions 
 President of the Japan Australia New Zealand Society, Inc.
 President of the Agricultural Society of Japan
 President of the Japan Forestry Association
 President of the Japan Art Crafts Association
 President of the Japanese Urushi Craft•Art Association

Ancestry

Patrilineal descent

Imperial House of Japan

 Descent prior to Keitai is unclear to modern historians, but traditionally traced back patrilineally to Emperor Jimmu
 Emperor Keitai, ca. 450–534
 Emperor Kinmei, 509–571
 Emperor Bidatsu, 538–585
 Prince Oshisaka, ca. 556–???
 Emperor Jomei, 593–641
 Emperor Tenji, 626–671
 Prince Shiki, ???–716
 Emperor Kōnin, 709–786
 Emperor Kanmu, 737–806
 Emperor Saga, 786–842
 Emperor Ninmyō, 810–850
 Emperor Kōkō, 830–867
 Emperor Uda, 867–931
 Emperor Daigo, 885–930
 Emperor Murakami, 926–967
 Emperor En'yū, 959–991
 Emperor Ichijō, 980–1011
 Emperor Go-Suzaku, 1009–1045
 Emperor Go-Sanjō, 1034–1073
 Emperor Shirakawa, 1053–1129
 Emperor Horikawa, 1079–1107
 Emperor Toba, 1103–1156
 Emperor Go-Shirakawa, 1127–1192
 Emperor Takakura, 1161–1181
 Emperor Go-Toba, 1180–1239
 Emperor Tsuchimikado, 1196–1231
 Emperor Go-Saga, 1220–1272
 Emperor Go-Fukakusa, 1243–1304
 Emperor Fushimi, 1265–1317
 Emperor Go-Fushimi, 1288–1336
 Emperor Kōgon, 1313–1364
 Emperor Sukō, 1334–1398
 Prince Yoshihito Fushimi, 1351–1416
 Prince Sadafusa Fushimi, 1372–1456
 Emperor Go-Hanazono, 1419–1471
 Emperor Go-Tsuchimikado, 1442–1500
 Emperor Go-Kashiwabara, 1464–1526
 Emperor Go-Nara, 1495–1557
 Emperor Ōgimachi, 1517–1593
 Prince Masahito, 1552–1586
 Emperor Go-Yōzei, 1572–1617
 Emperor Go-Mizunoo, 1596–1680
 Emperor Reigen, 1654–1732
 Emperor Higashiyama, 1675–1710
 Prince Naohito Kanin, 1704–1753
 Prince Sukehito Kanin, 1733–1794
 Emperor Kōkaku, 1771–1840
 Emperor Ninkō, 1800–1846
 Emperor Kōmei, 1831–1867
 Emperor Meiji, 1852–1912
 Emperor Taishō, 1879–1926
 Takahito, Prince Mikasa
 Yoshihito, Prince Katsura

References

External links 
 His Imperial Highness Prince Katsura at the Imperial Household Agency website

1948 births
2014 deaths
Australia–Japan relations
Australian National University alumni
Gakushuin University alumni
Japanese expatriates in Australia
Japanese people with disabilities
Japanese princes
NHK
People from Tokyo
People with paraplegia
Royalty and nobility with disabilities
Heirs apparent who never acceded

Knights Grand Cross of the Order of Merit of the Italian Republic
Recipients of the Order of the White Eagle (Poland)